The Fogcutters are a 19-piece big band based in Portland, Maine, led by John Maclaine. The Fogcutters feature a "traditional" big band set up but are not traditional in style. They are just as comfortable playing hard rock, hip-hop and funk as paying tribute to big band legends such as Duke Ellington and Cab Calloway.

History 
Since their founding in 2010, The Fogcutters have been delivering a brand new take on what a "big band" is and can be. With 13 horns, a burnin’ 5-piece rhythm section and the stellar vocals and presence of Megan Jo Wilson and Chas Lester, they balance subtlety and power by playing their own unique blend of funk, rock, afro-cuban, and hip-hop and combining them with traditional sounds.  Their groove is infectious and the impact upon the audience is stunning. Growing upon their continued success, The Fogcutters maintains their identity as performers of original music.
2016 marked a new beginning for The Fogcutters as they release their first album of original music, Flotsam. Flotsam is the culmination of years of creative writing and arranging from all members of the band. Inspired by classic and contemporary influences, Flotsam combines The Fogcutters groove and eclectic style in to a melting pot of sound and presents itself in an exciting, enormously invigorating, all original album.

In addition to Flotsam, The Fogcutters have released two other albums including "Big Band Syndrome Vol. 1, Live at The State Theatre" and a Christmas EP entitled "Jingle These Bells" which offers The Fogcutters take on classic Christmas Carols.

Since 2010, The Fogcutters have shared the stage with many notable musicians such as The Temptations and have created big band arrangements of Blues Traveler and Spin Doctors songs performed with John Popper and Chris Barron.

The Fogcutters were voted 2014 Best Jazz Act in New England at The New England Music Awards, and voted Best Jazz Act for 2012 & 2013 and the Best Live Act for 2013 by the Portland Phoenix Music Awards.

Members 
 John Maclaine – Leader, Trombone
 Chas Lester – Vocals, Percussion, Beat Box
 Megan Jo Wilson – Vocals
 Matthew Day – Trumpet
 Matt Lagarde – Trumpet
 Stephen Smith – Trumpet
 Emma Stanley – Trumpet
 Dave Noyes – Trombone
 James Hebert – Trombone
 Jamie Colpoys – Trombone
 Adam Montminy – Alto Sax
 Mat Leighton – Alto Sax
 Pat Sutor – Tenor Sax, Clarinet
 Tyler Card – Tenor Sax, Soprano Sax
 Scott Ogden – Baritone Sax
 Dave Henault – Drum Set
 Max Cantlin – Guitar
 Adam Frederick – Bass
 Emmett Harrity – Piano

Discography 
 Big Band Syndrome Vol. 1: Live at The State Theatre (2012)
 Jingle These Bells (2012) (Christmas EP)
 Big Band Syndrome Vol. 2: Live at the State Theatre (2013)
 Flotsam (Original album by The Fogcutters) (2016)

References

External links 
 

Musical groups from Portland, Maine
Big bands
Musical groups established in 2009